As of 2011, there are an estimated 25,000 gang members at large in El Salvador; another 43,500 are in prison. The best-known gangs, called maras in colloquial Salvadoran Spanish, are Mara Salvatrucha (MS-13) and their rivals 18th Street; maras are hunted by death squads, including Sombra Negra. Newer rivals include the rising mara, The Rebels 13. Criminal youth gangs dominate life in El Salvador; an estimation of at least 60,000 young people belong to gangs. It is one of the three countries of the Northern Triangle of Central America, along with neighboring Guatemala and Honduras, which are all afflicted with high levels of violence.

In 2012, El Salvador saw a 41% drop in crime compared to 2011 figures due to what the Salvadoran government called a gang truce. In early 2012, there were an average of 16 killings per day, but in late March that number dropped to fewer than five per day, and on April 14, 2012, for the first time in over three years, there were no killings in the country.  Overall, there were 411 killings in the month of January 2012, but in March the number was 188, more than a 40% reduction in crime. The truce ended in 2014, with the murder rate subsequently rising again.

Gangs engage in sex trafficking in El Salvador as an alternative source of profit to drugs.

History of violence in El Salvador
The Salvadoran Civil War, which lasted from 1979 to 1992, took the lives of approximately 80,000 soldiers and civilians in El Salvador. Throughout the war, nearly half of the country's population fled from violence and poverty, and children were recruited as soldiers by both the military-run government and the guerrilla group Farabundo Martí National Liberation Front (FMLN). Hundreds of thousands of Salvadorans relocated to Los Angeles, California. This conflict ended with the Chapultepec Peace Accords, but the violence in El Salvador has not stopped since.

Many of those who had relocated to Los Angeles during the war as refugees became involved in gang violence. During this time, the U.S. War on Drugs and anti-immigrant politics had been popularized. Following these sentiments, the Illegal Immigration Reform and Immigrant Responsibility Act of 1996 was passed, which called for deportation of "immigrants--documented or undocumented--with criminal records at the end of their jail sentences". Throughout the years following, thousands of Salvadorans had been deported back to El Salvador. Gangs that had originated in Los Angeles, namely Mara Salvatrucha and Barrio 18, were spread transnationally through this process.

Gangs

M-18 and MS-13 are the largest and most notorious in El Salvador. M-18 is also known as 18th Street and MS-13 as Mara Salvatrucha. M-18 was formed in the 1960s by Mexican-American youth in the Rampart neighborhood of Los Angeles, California."  The 18th Street gang, originating in Los Angeles, has proliferated in San Salvador. The Mara Salvatrucha is a rival gang.

Gangs and violence

Gangs contribute to the generally high levels of social violence in El Salvador. They engage in various serious criminal acts which terrorize and paralyze society. Homicide and extortion are the most publicized crimes. There are different forms of violence constructed in El Salvador such as political, gender, and structural violence. Women and children have been particular targets of violence, torture, and abuse.

Reasons for joining gangs
Salvadoran young men decide to join a gang for several reasons. Sometimes this is understood as a choice, but other motivations include feeling neglected and abandoned by family or feeling they don't belong anywhere except where violence occurs. Juan Fogelbach argues that general risk factors associated with gang membership include: poverty, family disintegration or separation, neglect, violent domestic environments, unemployment, scarcity of educational and developmental opportunities, and family membership in gangs. The presence of one or more of these factors may compel an adolescent or child to turn to gangs in hope of finding a familial environment, social status, and economic opportunities. The average age for one to join a gang is between 10 and 14 years old.

Links to drug trafficking
MS-13 and M-18 have an unknown relationship with drug traffickers. El Salvador police report that traffickers cultivate ties and build alliances with gangs that eventually mature into international syndicates. The drug business has been growing with more gangs becoming involved with them and disputing over territory with the drug traffickers. The United States is home to 10,000 members of the MS-13 gang who are involved with the transnational criminal networks of drugs, weapons, and violent gang culture.

Efforts to reduce violence

Government policy
The government has set up numerous programs to try to guide the youth away from gang membership. La Mano Dura was a form of zero tolerance policy, a strategy that had flowed into El Salvador from Los Angeles, which called for "the immediate imprisonment of a gang member simply for having gang-related tattoos or flashing gang signs in public." Before this policy was ruled unconstitutional, it put tens of thousands of gang members as young as 12 years old in jail between 2003 and 2004.

Following La Mano Dura was a government program called Super Mano Dura ("Super Firm Hand"). Super Mano Dura was highly criticized by the UN. According to the Salvadoran government, it saw temporary success in 2004 with a 14% drop in murders. This success dwindled beginning in the next year, and as of 2005, El Salvador had 65 homicides per 100,000 inhabitants, more than triple the current rate of Mexico.

Recent efforts by mayor Norman Quijano to restore public safety have been somewhat successful. Security measures in San Salvador's most troubled Districts (5 and 6, which border Soyapango, and are home to many gangs) included  safety campaigns and recreational activities to keep youth from  joining gangs. The mayor also initiated a security camera program so the police can monitor the most heavily trafficked areas of the city. The project was launched in the historic downtown and will expand throughout the entire city.

In late April, President Nayib Bukele ordered that prisons containing gang members be placed on lockdown following a spate of violence  between April 24 and April 27, 2020, that killed 77 people, which was blamed on gang members. As part of the Salvadoran government's crackdown, prisoners were locked in crowded cells for 23 hours a day; cell were barricaded with plywood and sheets of metal; mobile and wifi signals were blocked, and rival gang members were mixed together. Human Rights Watch has criticized the treatment of prisoners as humiliating, degrading, and endangering their health in the midst of the 2020 coronavirus pandemic.

Gang truce

In March 2012, two of El Salvador's largest gangs, MS-13 and Barrio 18, established a truce. This truce was established as a collaborative effort with the Salvadoran government to attempt to reduce the number of gang related homicides. This truce has received criticism because it has been seen as the Salvadoran government's forfeiting sovereignty to these gangs. In early 2012, there were on average of 16 killings per day, but in late March that number dropped to fewer than five per day, and on April 14, 2012, for the first time in over three years, there were no killings in the country. Overall, there were 411 killings in the month of January 2012, but in March the number was 188, more than a 50% reduction. In March 2015, 481 people were murdered—roughly 16 people a day—as the gang truce collapsed. This murder rate was 52% higher than that of the same time period the prior year. There were also allegations that the police was involved in extrajudicial killings of alleged gang members, following the fracturing of gangs and a radicalization of the security forces in an attempt to tackle the gang problem after the 2012 truce collapsed. The year before, in 2014, several gangs had offered a new truce as "a second chance for the country to achieve peace." However, President Salvador Sánchez Cerén had rejected the gangs' offer.

The administration of President Cerén launched a crackdown on the security and public officials of the previous administration who were responsible for mediating and implementing the truce between the government and the crime groups. The crackdown is part of the government's mano dura or "iron fist" approach, which has been criticized for its indiscriminate use of force against predominantly young male targets, suspected to be gang members.

Non-government groups

In 1996, Homies Unidos was formed to prevent violence and gang-membership among youth in El Salvador. With a base in Los Angeles as well as within El Salvador, the organization also provides a link for deportees and for those with family split between the two areas. The organization helps navigate the complicated and dangerous gang geography of El Salvador for deportees and also provides programming and care for young people in both locations. The organization encourages employment, education, and physical and mental health and provides tools and resources for achieving these things, such as tattoo removal and job connections.

Impact on youth

During the War
During the violent Salvadoran Civil War, children joined the fight for many reasons. Some were kidnapped and forced into the army, some others joined for the economic benefits while the country struggled through high rates of poverty. Family members had been killed or had fled the country, leaving the children alone with few other options other than joining the war effort. Even those who were not soldiers witnessed the brutal violence. Exposure to these traumatic events and the dislocation of families caused damaging psychological side effects from these traumatic exposures.

Gang involvement
Salvadoran youths join gangs for many reasons. Sometimes this is understood as a choice, but it can also be attributed to a feeling of neglect and abandonment from family as well as a normalization of violence in society. Juan Fogelbach argues that general risk factors associated with gang membership include poverty, family disintegration or separation, neglect, violent domestic environments, unemployment, scarcity of educational and developmental opportunities, and family membership in gangs. The presence of one or more of these factors may compel an adolescent or child to turn to gangs in hope of finding a familial environment, social status, and economic opportunities. These young people are often unable to find respect or validation in other forms, such as within families, community, work, or schools, and turn to violence to gain respect on the streets. Some of these young people grew up in Los Angeles as the children of war refugees, and experienced gang involvement there. Sent to El Salvador as deportees, these people now find community and protection in the familiar groups that have been brought to El Salvador from the U.S., like Mara Salvatrucha and Barrio 18.

Gang members are "jumped in," an initiation process through which they have to prove their loyalty by committing criminal acts such as murder, theft or violence. This can also involve being beaten by several other gang members at once, and female recruits often must choose between engaging in sexual acts with a large number of members, or be beaten. Youth gangs are a major source of concern for society.

Women in gangs
Though gangs are primarily male-dominated, young women in El Salvador are also involved. Being initiated into the gangs for young women often involves group beatings, like it does for males, but can also involve sexual assault by several of the male gang members. Mo Hume explains: "Because gangs believe women are less suspicious in the eyes of authorities, they are also often tasked with acting as drug 'mules,' smuggling illicit goods into jails, gathering intelligence on rival gangs, and carrying arms in public spaces".

Unaccompanied minors fleeing El Salvador
Young people are fleeing El Salvador to the United States, fearful of gang violence. Since the breakdown of the gang peace agreement in 2012, the number of these Unaccompanied Alien Children (UACs) encountered in the U.S. has risen dramatically. Between 2009 and 2012, less than 2,000 UACs were encountered annually. In the 2014 fiscal year, over 16,000 were encountered. The fiscal years 2012 through 2016 saw an average of nearly 8,000.

According to a report by the United Nations High Commissioner for Refugees, "Given the fundamental role played by the family in the protection, physical care and emotional well-being of its members, separation from families is particularly devastating for refugee children.

Region specific

San Salvador
Concerns about public safety in the capital San Salvador increased in the late 1980s due to the civil war.  Although it was fought primarily in the countryside, during the latter years of the war, guerrillas started attacking the capital city. San Salvador recovered quickly after the cessation of hostilities, but gang ("mara") violence became a problem.

The 18th Street gang, originating in Los Angeles, California, has proliferated in San Salvador as has the Mara Salvatrucha, a rival gang. In 2002, crime rates skyrocketed, and the municipal government was unable to combat the rise.

Recent efforts by mayor Norman Quijano to restore public safety have been somewhat successful. Security measures in San Salvador's most troubled Districts (5 and 6, which border Soyapango, and are home to many gangs) included safety campaigns and recreational activities to keep youth from  joining gangs. The mayor also initiated a security camera program so the police can monitor the most heavily trafficked areas of the city. The project was launched in the historic downtown and will expand throughout the entire city.

As of 2011, San Salvador had managed to reduce its crime rate and reduce its murder rate to a level lower than that of Haiti, Venezuela, Mexico, Guatemala, or Honduras, although at over 90 murders per 100,000 residents, San Salvador's per capita rate was more than 10 times higher than that of major cities such as New York or London. Also, according to a UN Development report, San Salvador has a relatively low robbery rate of 90 per 100,000, compared to San José, the capital of Costa Rica, which has 524 robberies per 100,000.

Districts 3 and 4 are the safest in the country; their crime rates are comparable to those of European cities.  Districts 1 and 2 have a slightly higher crime rate than 3 or 4, while District 5, bordering San Marcos, and District 6, bordering Soyapango, have the highest crime rates.

Homicide by municipality (2009–2014)

See also

 Human trafficking in El Salvador
 Illegal drug trade in El Salvador

References

External links
Crime in El Salvador. The broken-truce theory. The Economist, Jan 31st 2015
Salvadoran Gang Truce Collapses March 2015
U.S. Imposes Sanctions on 3 Leaders of Gang Based in El Salvador